The following railroad lines were owned or operated by the Pennsylvania Railroad east of Pittsburgh and Erie.

New York to Philadelphia
Main Line (New York to Philadelphia)
Harrison Branch (Harrison)
Jersey City Branch (Harrison to Jersey City)
Harsimus Branch (Harsimus Junction to Harsimus Cove)
Passaic Branch (Meadows to Newark)
Lister Branch (Newark)
Meadows Branch No. 1 (Meadows)
Meadows Branch No. 2 (Meadows)
Centre Street Branch (Harrison to Newark)
West Newark Branch (West Newark Junction to West Newark)
Greenville Branch (Newark to Greenville)
Perth Amboy and Woodbridge Branch (Perth Amboy Junction to Perth Amboy)
Bonhamtown Branch (Metuchen to Nixon)
Millstone branch (Millstone Junction to East Millstone)
Kingston Branch (Monmouth Junction to Kingston)
Rocky Hill Branch (Kingston to Rocky Hill)
Princeton Branch (Princeton Junction to Princeton)
Belvidere Delaware Branch (Trenton to Manunka Chunk)
Millham Branch (Trenton)
South Trenton Branch (Trenton)
Enterprise Branch (Trenton)
Flemington Branch (Flemington Junction to Flemington)
Martins Creek Branch (Martins Creek)
Bristol Branch (Bristol)
Bustleton Branch (Holmesburg Junction to Bustleton)
Kensington and Tacony Branch (Tacony to Kensington)
Trenton Avenue Branch (Frankford Junction to Kensington)
Frankford Street Branch (Philadelphia)
Filter Street Branch (Philadelphia)
Westmoreland Street Branch (Philadelphia)
Delaware Avenue Branch (Kensington to Philadelphia)
Commerce Street Branch (Kensington)
Canal Street Branch (Shackamaxon)
Delair Branch (Frankford Junction to West Haddonfield)
Pemberton Branch (Pavonia to Pemberton)
Oxford Road Branch (Philadelphia)
Fairhill Branch (Fairhill)
Stifftown Branch (North Philadelphia)
Chestnut Hill Branch (North Philadelphia to Chestnut Hill)
Midvale Branch (Midvale)
Fort Washington Branch (Philadelphia to Fort Hill)
Engelside Branch (Engelside)
New York-Pittsburgh Subway (West Philadelphia)
River Line (West Philadelphia)
Belmont Branch (West Philadelphia Connection ZOO to Reading Co at Belmont Jct)
West Philadelphia Elevated Branch (West Philadelphia)
Delaware Extension (West Philadelphia to Philadelphia)
Washington Avenue Branch (Philadelphia)
Girard Point Branch (Philadelphia)
Swanson Street Branch (Philadelphia)
Amboy Branch (South Amboy to Camden)
Jamesburg Branch (Jamesburg to Monmouth Junction)
Freehold Branch (Jamesburg to Sea Girt)
Bordentown Branch (Bordentown to Trenton)
Kinkora Branch (Kinkora to Lewistown)
Florence Branch (Florence)
Burlington and Mount Holly Branch (Burlington to Mount Holly line was abandoned in 1927)
Petty's Island Branch (Beideman to Petty's Island)
Pemberton Branch (Pavonia to Pemberton)
Mount Holly and Medford Branch (Mount Holly to Medford)  
Toms River Branch (Birmingham to Bay Head)

Philadelphia to Washington
Pennsylvania Main Line
West Chester Branch (West Philadelphia to West Chester)
Newtown Square Branch (Fernwood to Newtown Square)
Cardington Branch (Millbourne Mills)
Octoraro Branch (Wawa to Port Deposit)
60th Street Branch (West Philadelphia)
Chester and Philadelphia Branch (West Philadelphia to Chester)
Chester Creek Branch (Chester to Lenni)
Lamokin Run Branch (Chester)
South Chester Branch (Chester to Marcus Hook)
Claymont Branch (Marcus Hook)
Linwood Branch (Marcus Hook)
Shellpot Branch (Edge Moor to Newport)
Edge Moor Branch (Edge Moor)
Brandywine Branch (Wilmington)
West Wilmington Branch (Wilmington)
Delaware Branch (Newport to Cape Charles)
New Castle Cut-off (New Castle)
Centreville Branch (Townsend to Centreville)
Chestertown Branch (Massey to Chestertown)
Smyrna Branch (Clayton to Smyrna)
Oxford Branch (Clayton to Oxford)
Delaware, Maryland and Virginia Branch (Harrington to Ross)
Milton Branch (Ellendale to Milton)
Rehoboth Branch (Georgetown to Rehoboth)
Cambridge Branch (Seaford to Cambridge)
Crisfield Secondary Branch Originally opened as Eastern Shore Railroad between Princess Anne (Westover) and Annamessex (Crisfield), Md.
Cape Charles Branch (Cape CHarles to Kiptopeke)
Newark and Delaware City Branch (Newark to Delaware City)
Havre de Grace Branch (Havre de Grace)
Port Road Branch (Perryville to Columbia)
Perryville Branch (Frenchtown to Principio)
Sparrow's Point Branch (Baltimore to Sparrow's Point)
President Street Branch (Bay View to Baltimore)
Claremont Branch (Baltimore)
Catonsville Branch (Loudon Park to Catonsville)
Fort George G. Meade Branch (Odenton to Fort George G. Meade)
Pope's Creek Branch (Bowie to Pope's Creek)
Magruder Branch (Landover to Washington)
Rosslyn Branch (Arlington to Rosslyn)
Northern Central Branch (Baltimore to Wago Junction)
Green Spring Branch (Hollins to Chattolanee)
York Branch (Columbia to York)
Frederick Branch (York to Frederick)
Union Bridge Branch (Keymar to Union Bridge)
Baltimore and Eastern Railroad (Marsh Siding to Mardela Springs)
Mill Street Branch (Salisbury)
McDaniel Branch (Easton to McDaniel)
Denton Branch (Denton to Love Point)

Philadelphia to Harrisburg
Pennsylvania Main Line
36th Street Connection (West Philadelphia)
32nd Street Branch (West Philadelphia)
Schuylkill Branch (West Philadelphia to New Boston Junction)
Pencoyd Branch (Barmouth to West Manayunk)
Royersford Branch (Royersford)
Court Street Branch (Reading)
Minersville Branch (Pottsville to Lytle)
Shenandoah Branch (Frackville to Shenandoah)
Gilberton Branch (Gilberton)
Girardville Branch (Girardville)
Morea Branch (Morea)
West Chester Branch (Frazer to West Chester)
Trenton Branch (Glen Loch to Morrisville)
Philadelphia and Thorndale Branch (Glen Loch to Thorndale)
Phoenixville Branch (Glen Loch to Phoenixville)
Swedeland Branch (Swedeland)
New Holland Branch (Chester Valley Intersection to Conestoga)
Coatesville Branch (Pomeroy)
Pomeroy Branch (Pomeroy to Chatham)
Atglen and Susquehanna Branch (Parkesburg to Wago Junction)
York Haven Line (Wago Junction to Marysville)
Quarryville Branch (Lancaster to Quarryville)
Lebanon Branch (Conewago to Lebanon)
North Lebanon Branch (Lebanon)
East Lebanon Branch (Lebanon)
Columbia Branch (Dillerville to Royalton)
Steelton Canal Branch (Harrisburg)

Harrisburg to Pittsburgh
Pennsylvania Main Line
Cumberland Valley Branch (Harrisburg to Winchester)
Dillsburg Branch (Dillsburg Junction to Dillsburg)
Waynesboro Branch (Chambersburg to Waynesboro)
South Penn Branch (Marion to Richmond)
Mercersburg Branch (Mercersburg Junction to Mercersburg)
Milroy Branch
Petersburg Branch (part became Lower Trail)
Clover Creek Branch
Springfield Branch
Canoe Creek Branch
Crissman Branch
New Portage Branch (from west of Gallitzin Tunnels to Hollidaysburg; part became a segment of the 6 to 10 Trail)
Fairbrook Branch
Bald Eagle Branch
Clearfield Branch
Osceola Branch
Moshannon Branch
Trout Run Branch
Big Run Branch
Moshannon and Clearfield Branch
Beaver Branch
Ednie Branch
Coal Run Branch
Morgan Run Branch
Burley Branch
Goss Run Branch No. 1
Goss Run Branch No. 2
Goss Run Branch No. 3
Houtzdale Branch
Amesville Branch No. 1
Amesville Branch No. 2
Little Muddy Run Branch
Janesville Branch
Muddy Run Branch
Smoke Run Branch
Banian Branch
Betz Branch
Mapleton Branch No. 1
Mapleton Branch No. 2
Philipsburg Branch
Derby Branch
Snow-Shoe Branch
Sugar Camp Branch
Grauer Branch
Big Sandy Branch
Bellefonte Branch
Hollidaysburg Branch
Morrison's Cove Branch
Bloomfield Branch
Martinsburg Branch
Irvona Branch
Stevens Branch
Hegarty Branch
Mayes Branch
South Witmer Branch
Bellwood Branch
Stroud Branch
Cresson Branch
Black Lick Branch (became part of Ghost Town Trail)
Coal Pit Run Branch
Shuman Run Branch
Rexis Branch
Susquehanna Extension Branch
Luther Branch
Sterling Branch
Walnut Run Branch
Porter Run Branch
Gardner Run Branch
Moss Creek Branch
Patton Branch No. 2
Patton Branch No. 3
Patton Branch No. 1
Hastings Branch
La Jose Branch
McGees Branch
Glen Campbell Branch
McCoy Run Branch
Suter Branch
Mahaffey Branch
Bear Run Branch
Hillman Branch
Elk Run Branch
Lilly Branch
Ben's Creek Branch
Martin Branch
Sonman Branch
Summerhill Branch
South Fork Branch
Beaver Branch
Llanfair Branch
Paint Creek Branch
Eureka Branch No. 37
Shade Creek Branch
Reitz Branch
Windber Branch
Johnstown Branch
Sang Hollow Extension
New Florence Branch
Bradenville Branch
Unity Branch
Lippincott Branch
Alexandria Branch
Jamison Branch
South-west Branch
Brush Creek Branch
Bull Run Branch
Jeanette Branch
Manor Branch
Youghiogheny Branch
Turtle Creek Branch
Lyons Run Branch
East Pittsburgh Branch
Port Perry Branch
Brilliant Branch
Duquesne Way Elevated Branch
Bedford Branch
Mt. Dallas Branch
Rockville Branch
Elmira Branch
Lykens Valley Branch
Bellefonte Branch
Laurelton Branch
Berwick Branch
Millville Branch
Williamsport and Linden Branch
Canal Branch
Williamsport Lumber Branch
Sodus Bay Branch
Marion Branch
Canandaigua Lake Branch
Philadelphia and Erie Branch
Newberry Branch
Low Grade Branch (Redbank to Driftwood on Buffalo Line, section became Redbank Valley Trail)
Brookville Branch
Sligo Branch (became Sligo Spur of Redbank Valley Trail)
Ridgway Branch
10th Street Branch
Wilkes-Barre Branch
Glen Lyon Branch
West Nanticoke Branch
Shamokin Valley Branch
Lancaster Branch
Scott Branch
Green Ridge Branch
Fagely Branch
Montelius Branch
Lewistown Branch
Catawissa Branch
Nescopeck Branch
Monongahela Branch
Whitehall Branch
Axle Works Branch
Streets Run Branch
McKeesport Branch
Peters Creek Branch (became part of Montour Trail)
Ellsworth Branch
Cokeburg Branch
Redstone Branch
Grindstone Branch
Keister Branch
Vance Mill Branch
South-west Branch
Radebaugh Branch
Hempfield Branch
Andrews Run Branch
Sewickley Branch
Boyer Run Branch
Brinker Run Branch
Mammoth Branch
Bessemer Branch
Marguerite Branch
Hunker Branch
Yukon Branch
Whyel Branch
Hunter Run Branch
Youghiogheny Branch
Tarr Branch
Scottdale Branch
Everson and Broad Ford Branch
Opossum Run Branch
Dunbar Branch
Coal Lick Run Branch
Rainey Branch
Fairchance Branch
Oliphant Branch
Indiana Branch
Blairsville Branch
Yellow Creek Branch
Conemaugh Line
Avonmore Branch
Apollo Branch
Butler Branch
Bailey's Run Branch
Allegheny Branch
Plum Creek Branch
Indian Run Branch
Pucketa Branch
Schenley Branch
East Brady Branch
Salamanca Branch
Kinzua Branch
Rochester Branch
Nunda Branch
Rochester Terminal Branch
Chautauqua Branch
Buffalo Line
Clermont Branch
Salamanca Branch
West Seneca Branch

See also
List of Pennsylvania Railroad lines west of Pittsburgh

References

Pennsylvania Railroad, Form CT1000, List of Stations and Sidings and Instructions for Making Reports to the Superintendent Car Service